The Chenango Ice Rink & Event Center is a 1,200-seat ice arena located in Chenango, New York. The ice arena is home to the Binghamton University Bearcats ice hockey team competing in the American Collegiate Hockey Association as members of the Northeast Collegiate Hockey League, and was the 2010-11 home of the Broome County Barons playing in Federal Hockey League (FHL), a minor professional ice hockey league.

The arena is also home to several local high school ice hockey teams, and is used by local figure skating clubs, youth, and adult recreational ice hockey leagues, as well as public skating. The arena served as the home of the Binghamton Jr. Senators playing in the Tier III Junior A Atlantic Junior Hockey League until 2010, when the team moved to Wilkes-Barre/Scranton, Pennsylvania, to become the Wilkes-Barre/Scranton Knights.

References

External links
Chenango Ice Rink
Broome County Barons
Binghamton Bearcats Ice Hockey

College ice hockey venues in the United States
Indoor arenas in New York (state)
Indoor ice hockey venues in the United States